It's Not Easy Being a Bunny is a children's book written by Marilyn Sadler and illustrated by Roger Bollen. It is about a young bunny named P.J. Funnybunny and his adventures as he goes to live with various different animals because he does not like being a bunny. The story ends with him being a bunny again when he comes back to the other bunnies and he likes them all again.

1983 children's books
American picture books
Children's fiction books
Books about rabbits and hares